Richard Ewing Powell (November 14, 1904 – January 2, 1963) was an American actor, musician, producer, director, and studio head. Though he came to stardom as a musical comedy performer, he showed versatility and successfully transformed into a hardboiled leading man, starring in projects of a more dramatic nature. He was the first actor to portray private detective Philip Marlowe on screen.

Early life
Powell was born the middle of three sons of mother Sally Rowena in Mountain View, the seat of Stone County in northern Arkansas. His brothers were Howard (the eldest) and Luther (the youngest). The family moved the boys to Little Rock in 1914, where Powell sang in church choirs and with local orchestras and started his own band. Powell attended the former Little Rock College before he started his entertainment career as a singer with the Royal Peacock Band, which toured throughout the Midwest. 

During this time, he married Mildred Maund, a model, but she found being married to an entertainer not to her liking. After a final trip to Cuba together, Mildred moved to Hemphill, Texas, and the couple divorced in 1932. Later, Powell joined the Charlie Davis Orchestra, based in Indianapolis. He recorded a number of records with Davis and on his own for the Vocalion label in the late 1920s.

Stardom

Powell moved to Pittsburgh, where he found great local success as the master of ceremonies at the Enright Theater and the Stanley Theater.

Warner Bros.
In April 1930, Warner Bros. bought Brunswick Records, which at that time owned Vocalion. Warner Bros. was sufficiently impressed by Powell's singing and stage presence to offer him a film contract in 1932. He made his film debut as a singing bandleader in Blessed Event.

He was borrowed by Fox Film to support Will Rogers in Too Busy to Work (1932). He was a boyish crooner, the sort of role in which he specialized for the next few years. Back at Warner Bros., he supported George Arliss in The King's Vacation, then was in 42nd Street (both 1933), playing the love interest for Ruby Keeler. The film was a massive hit.

Warner Bros. (WB) got him basically to repeat the role in Gold Diggers of 1933, another big success. So too was Footlight Parade (also 1933), with Keeler and James Cagney.

Powell was upped to star for College Coach (1933), then went back to more ensemble pieces including 42nd Street, Convention City (both 1933), Wonder Bar, Twenty Million Sweethearts, and Dames (all 1934).

Happiness Ahead was more of a star vehicle for Powell, as was Flirtation Walk (both 1934). He was top-billed in Gold Diggers of 1935 and Broadway Gondolier (both 1935), both with Joan Blondell. He supported Marion Davies in Page Miss Glory (1935), made for Cosmopolitan Pictures, a production company financed by Davies' lover William Randolph Hearst, who released through WB.

WB gave him a change of pace, casting him as Lysander in A Midsummer Night's Dream (1935).

More typical was Shipmates Forever (1935) with Keeler. 20th Century Fox borrowed him for Thanks a Million (1935); back at WB, he did Colleen (1936) with Keeler and Blondell. Powell was reunited with Marion Davies in another for Cosmopolitan, Hearts Divided (1936), playing Napoleon's brother.

He made two films with Blondell, Stage Struck (1936) and Gold Diggers of 1937. 20th Century Fox then borrowed him again for On the Avenue (1937).

Back at WB, he appeared in The Singing Marine and Varsity Show (both 1937), Hollywood Hotel, Cowboy from Brooklyn, Hard to Get, Going Places (all 1938), and Naughty but Nice (1939). Fed up with the repetitive nature of these roles, Powell left WB and went to work for Paramount Pictures.

Paramount
At Paramount, Blondell and Powell were cast together again in the drama I Want a Divorce (1940). Then Powell got a chance to appear in another non-musical, Christmas in July (1940), a screwball comedy which was the second feature directed by Preston Sturges.

Universal borrowed him to support Abbott and Costello in In the Navy (1941), one of the most popular films of 1941. At Paramount he had a cameo in Star Spangled Rhythm and co-starred with Mary Martin in Happy Go Lucky (both 1943). He supported Dorothy Lamour in Riding High (1943).

In 1944, he was in a fantasy comedy directed by René Clair, It Happened Tomorrow, then went over to MGM to appear opposite Lucille Ball in Meet the People, which was a box-office flop.

During this period, Powell starred in the musical  Campana Serenade, which was broadcast on NBC radio (1942–1943) and CBS radio (1943–1944).

"Tough guy"
By 1944, Powell felt he was too old to play romantic leading men anymore, so he lobbied to play the lead in Double Indemnity. He lost out to Fred MacMurray, another Hollywood nice guy. MacMurray's success, however, fueled Powell's resolve to pursue projects with greater range.

Powell's career changed dramatically when he was cast in the first of a series of films noir, as private detective Philip Marlowe in Murder, My Sweet (1944), directed by Edward Dmytryk at RKO. The film was a big hit, and Powell had successfully reinvented himself as a dramatic actor. He was the first actor to play Marlowe – by name – in motion pictures. (Hollywood had previously adapted some Marlowe novels, but with the lead character changed.) Later, Powell was the first actor to play Marlowe on radio in 1944 and 1945 and on television in a 1954 episode of Climax! Powell also played the slightly less hard-boiled detective Richard Rogue in the radio series Rogue's Gallery beginning in 1945.

In 1945, Dmytryk and Powell reteamed to make the film Cornered, a gripping post-World War II thriller that helped define the film noir style.

For Columbia, he played a casino owner in Johnny O'Clock (1947) and made To the Ends of the Earth (1948). Also in 1948, he stepped out of the brutish type when he starred in Pitfall, a film noir in which a bored insurance-company worker falls for an innocent but dangerous woman, played by Lizabeth Scott.

He broadened his range appearing in a Western, Station West (1948) and a French Foreign Legion tale, Rogues' Regiment (1949). He was a Mountie in Mrs. Mike (1950).

From 1949 to 1953, Powell played the lead role in the NBC radio theater production Richard Diamond, Private Detective. His character in the 30-minute weekly show was a likable private detective with a quick wit. Many episodes ended with Detective Diamond having an excuse to sing a little song to his date, showcasing Powell's vocal abilities. Many of the episodes were written by Blake Edwards. When Richard Diamond came to television in 1957, the lead role was portrayed by David Janssen, who did no singing in the series. Prior to the Richard Diamond series, he starred in Rogue's Gallery. He played Richard Rogue, private detective. The Richard Diamond tongue-in-cheek persona developed in the Rogue series.

Powell took a break from tough-guy roles in The Reformer and the Redhead (1950), opposite wife June Allyson. Then he was back to tougher movies: Right Cross (1950), a boxing film with Allyson; Cry Danger (1951), as an ex-convict; The Tall Target (1951), at MGM directed by Anthony Mann, playing a detective who tries to prevent the assassination of Abraham Lincoln.

He returned to comedy with You Never Can Tell (1951). Poeell had a supporting role in MGM's popular melodrama The Bad and the Beautiful (1952). His final film performance was in a romantic comedy Susan Slept Here (1954) for director Frank Tashlin.

Even when he appeared in lighter fare such as The Reformer and the Redhead and Susan Slept Here, he never sang in his later roles. The latter, his final onscreen appearance in a feature film, did include a dance number with co-star Debbie Reynolds.

Director
By this stage, Powell had turned director. His feature debut was Split Second (1953) at RKO Pictures.  He followed it with The Conqueror (1956), coproduced by Howard Hughes and starring John Wayne as Genghis Khan. The exterior scenes were filmed in St. George, Utah, downwind of U.S. above-ground atomic tests. The cast and crew totaled 220, and of that number, 91 had developed some form of cancer by 1981, and 46 had died of cancer by then, including Powell and Wayne.

He directed Allyson opposite Jack Lemmon in You Can't Run Away from It (1956). Powell then made two war films at Fox with Robert Mitchum, The Enemy Below (1957) and The Hunters (1958).

Television
In the 1950s, Powell was one of the founders of Four Star Television, with Charles Boyer, David Niven, and Ida Lupino. He appeared in and supervised several shows for that company. Powell played the role of Willie Dante in Four Star Playhouse in episodes entitled "Dante's Inferno" (1952), "The Squeeze" (1953), "The Hard Way" (1953), and "The House Always Wins" (1955). In 1961, Howard Duff, husband of Ida Lupino, assumed the Dante role in a short-lived NBC adventure series Dante, set at a San Francisco nightclub called "Dante's Inferno".

Powell guest-starred in numerous Four Star programs, including a 1958 appearance on the Duff-Lupino sitcom Mr. Adams and Eve. He appeared in 1961 on James Whitmore's legal drama The Law and Mr. Jones on ABC. In the episode "Everybody Versus Timmy Drayton", Powell played a colonel having problems with his son. Shortly before his death, Powell sang on camera for the final time in a guest-star appearance on Four Star's Ensign O'Toole, singing "The Song of the Marines", which he first sang in his 1937 film The Singing Marine.  He hosted and occasionally starred in his Dick Powell's Zane Grey Theater on CBS from 1956 to 1961, and his final anthology series, The Dick Powell Show on NBC from 1961 through 1963; after his death, the series continued through the end of its second season (as The Dick Powell Theater), with guest hosts.

Personal life

Powell was the son of Ewing Powell and Sallie Rowena Thompson.

He married three times:
 Mildred Evelyn Maund (b. 1906, d. 1967). They divorced in 1932, although Mildred retained her married name.
 Joan Blondell (married September 19, 1936, divorced 1944).  He adopted her son from a previous marriage, Norman Powell, who later became a television producer; the couple also had one child together, Ellen Powell.
 June Allyson (August 19, 1945, until his death, January 2, 1963), with whom he had two children, Pamela (adopted) and Richard Powell, Jr.

Powell's ranch-style house was used for exterior filming on the ABC TV series, Hart to Hart. Powell was a friend of Hart to Hart actor Robert Wagner and producer Aaron Spelling. The estate, known as Amber Hills, is on 48 acres in the Mandeville Canyon section of Brentwood, Los Angeles.

Powell enjoyed general aviation as a private pilot.

Illness and death
On September 27, 1962, Powell acknowledged rumors that he was undergoing treatment for cancer. The disease was originally diagnosed as an allergy, with Powell first experiencing symptoms while traveling east to promote his program. Upon his return to California, Powell's personal physician conducted tests and found malignant tumors on his neck and chest.

The marker on Dick Powell's niche in Forest Lawn Memorial Park, Glendale, California, incorrectly identifies his year of death as 1962. Powell died at the age of 58 on January 2, 1963. His body was cremated and his remains were interred in the Columbarium of Honor at Forest Lawn Memorial Park in Glendale, California.

It is speculated Powell developed cancer as a result of his participation in the film The Conqueror, which was filmed at St. George, Utah, near a site used by the U.S. military for nuclear testing. About a third of the actors who participated in the film developed cancer, including Powell, who directed the film, John Wayne, Susan Hayward and Agnes Moorehead. However, in a 2001 interview with Larry King, Powell's widow June Allyson stated that the cause of death was lung cancer due to his chain smoking.

During the 15th Primetime Emmy Awards on May 26, 1963, the Television Academy presented a posthumous Television Academy Trustee Award to Dick Powell for his contributions to the industry. The award was accepted by two of his former partners in Four Star Television, Charles Boyer and David Niven.

Dick Powell has a star on the Hollywood Walk of Fame at 6915 Hollywood Boulevard.

Filmography

As actor

Features

Short subjects

The Road Is Open Again (1933)
Just Around the Corner (1933)
Hollywood on Parade No. A-9 (1933)
And She Learned About Dames (1934)
Hollywood Newsreel (1934)
A Dream Comes True (1935)
Hollywood Hobbies (1939)

As director

Split Second (1953)
The Conqueror (1956)
You Can't Run Away from It (1956)
The Enemy Below (1957)
The Hunters (1958)

Radio appearances
Powell was the first actor to play private detective Philip Marlowe on radio, in 1945. 

Lux Radio Theatre appearances:

Partial list of recordings
 "I Only Have Eyes for You" (1934) from the film Dames. 
 "Roses in December" (1937) words and music by Herb Magidson, Ben Oakland and George Jessel. (The song first appeared in The Life of the Party.) ISWC: T-070127274-3
 "Over There"/"Captains of the Clouds" (1942–Decca 4174) Issued early in World War II, the A side brought back a patriotic song that had been popular in World War I. The B side came from a James Cagney film of the same name.
 "Susan Slept Here" (Jack Lawrence)/"Hold My Hand" (Richard Myers-Jack Lawrence), Bell Records 1048. Both songs were sung (not by Powell) in the film Susan Slept Here (1954).

References

External links
Appearance On What's My Line 8/24/58
Appearance On What's My Line 9/17/61
Appearance On What's My Line 9/9/62

 
 
 
 
 Dick Powell Photo Gallery
 Dick Powell.net, a Fansite
 Photographs and literature
 
 Cinderella's Boyfriend – 1934 article about Powell from Radio Mirror

1904 births
1963 deaths
American chief executives
American Christian Scientists
American company founders
American male film actors
American male radio actors
American male television actors
American people of Welsh descent
American television directors
American television executives
American television hosts
Bell Records artists
Big band singers
Burials at Forest Lawn Memorial Park (Glendale)
Businesspeople from Arkansas
Businesspeople from Los Angeles
Businesspeople from Pennsylvania
California Republicans
Deaths from lung cancer in California
Film directors from Arkansas
Film directors from Los Angeles
Film producers from Pennsylvania
Film directors from Pennsylvania
Film producers from California
Male actors from Arkansas
Male actors from Los Angeles
Male actors from Pittsburgh
Musicians from Pittsburgh
People from Mandeville Canyon, Los Angeles
People from Mountain View, Arkansas
People from Valley Center, California
Singers from Arkansas
Singers from Los Angeles
Singers from Pennsylvania
Television producers from California
Television producers from Pennsylvania
University of Arkansas at Little Rock alumni
Warner Bros. contract players
Western (genre) television actors
American male jazz musicians
20th-century American businesspeople
20th-century American male actors
20th-century American singers
20th-century American male singers